Nogueira de Ramuín is a municipality in the province of Ourense in the Galicia region of north-west Spain. The municipality consists of 13 parroquias, the capital being Luintra.

References  

Municipalities in the Province of Ourense